Prachinburi railway station is a railway station in Na Mueang Subdistrict, Prachin Buri City, Prachinburi Province. The station opened in January 1925, as part of the Eastern Line Chachoengsao Junction-Kabin Buri section.

Train services 

 Ordinary Train No. 275/276 Bangkok - Ban Klong Luk Border - Bangkok
 Ordinary Train No. 277/278 Bangkok - Kabin Buri - Bangkok
 Ordinary Train No. 279/280 Bangkok - Ban Klong Luk Border - Bangkok
 Ordinary Train No. 281/282 Bangkok - Kabin Buri - Bangkok
 Ordinary Train No. 371/372 Bangkok - Prachin Buri - Bangkok

References 

 
 
 
 

Railway stations in Thailand
Railway stations opened in 1925
Prachinburi province